Mortal Throne of Nazarene is the second studio album by the American death metal band Incantation. The album was released in 1994 on Relapse Records (US) and Nuclear Blast Records (Europe).

This particular album had been recorded in its entirety already in August 1993 but Relapse Records wanted the band to record again due to not being happy with the results.  Situations like this and other incidents that followed  led to the infamous bad blood between John McEntee and the label. . The alternate version of the album was released in 1995 as Upon the Throne of Apocalypse, with a different mix and track orders reversed.

Track listing
All songs written by Craig Pillard and John McEntee.

Credits

Craig Pillard - Guitar/Vocals
John McEntee - Guitars, Mixing
Jim Roe - Session Drums
Dan Kamp - Bass
Incantation and Garris Shippon - Producers
Garris Shipon - Engineer
Mr Bill - Engineer
Brian Sekula - Mixing
Dave Shirk - Mastering
Miran Kim - Cover Artwork
Wes Benscoter - Booklet and Tray Art

References

Incantation (band) albums
1994 albums
Albums produced by Steve Evetts
Albums with cover art by Wes Benscoter